Mukhrovani is the name of a village and location in Kakheti, Georgia.

See also
 Kakheti

Notes

References
 A. Belkin, United We Stand?, SUNY Press. (New York, 2005)
 J. Wheatley, Georgia from national awakening to Rose Revolution, Asgate Publishing, Ltd. (London, 2005)

Geography of Georgia (country)
Populated places in Kakheti